Sameodes is a genus of moths of the family Crambidae described by Snellen in 1880.

Species
Sameodes abstrusalis (Moore, 1888)
Sameodes alexalis Schaus, 1927
Sameodes cancellalis (Zeller, 1852)
Sameodes distictalis Hampson, 1899
Sameodes enderythralis Hampson, 1899
Sameodes ennoduisalis Schaus, 1927
Sameodes finbaralis Schaus, 1927
Sameodes furvipicta Hampson, 1913
Sameodes microspilalis Hampson, 1913
Sameodes odulphalis Schaus, 1927
Sameodes pictalis Swinhoe, 1895
Sameodes polythiptalis Hampson, 1899
Sameodes ulricalis Schaus, 1927

Former species
Sameodes iolealis (Walker, 1859)
Sameodes tristalis Kenrick, 1907

References

Spilomelinae
Crambidae genera